The Charleston Northern Railway was a railroad that operated in South Carolina in the early part of the 20th century.

In 1914, the Charleston Northern, South Carolina Western Railway, and South Carolina Western Extension Railway were merged into the North and South Carolina Railway. The name of the consolidated railroad company was then changed to the Carolina, Atlantic and Western Railway.

The following year, the line's name was changed to the Seaboard Air Line Railway Company.

References

Defunct South Carolina railroads
Railway companies established in 1913
Railway companies disestablished in 1914
Predecessors of the Seaboard Air Line Railroad
1913 establishments in South Carolina
American companies established in 1913